Sergei Aleksandrovich Rashevsky (born 13 June 1980) is a Russian football coach and a former player. He is an assistant coach with FC Rotor Volgograd.

Club career
He made his debut in the Russian Premier League in 2001 for FC Rotor Volgograd, before moving to Ural in 2005. After several seasons playing for different clubs in Russia, Rashevsky signed with Volga in 2008. He played for the club for three years, before he returned to Ural in 2011.

Since February 2014, he played for the Russian National Football League side Yenisey Krasnoyarsk.

External links
  Official profile at fc-ural.ru

References

1980 births
Living people
Russian footballers
FC Rotor Volgograd players
FC Ural Yekaterinburg players
FC Zvezda Irkutsk players
FC Baltika Kaliningrad players
Russian Premier League players
FC Volga Nizhny Novgorod players
FC Sodovik Sterlitamak players
FC Luch Vladivostok players
FC Yenisey Krasnoyarsk players
Association football midfielders
FC Tambov players
FC Khimik Dzerzhinsk players
Sportspeople from Volgograd